Vladimir Vasilevich Pyshnenko (born 25 March 1970) is a Russian former freestyle swimmer who won one gold medal and two silver medals at the 1992 Summer Olympics at Barcelona and one silver medal at the 1996 Summer Olympics at Atlanta. He also won two silver medals at the 1994 World Aquatics Championships in Rome and one gold medal at the European LC Championships 1991.

Career

Olympics 
Vladimir Pyshnenko qualified for both the 1992 Summer Olympics in Barcelona, and the 1996 Summer Olympics in Atlanta. He represented the Unified Team in the 1992 Olympics due to the recent dissolution of the Soviet Union. In the 1992 games, he won a gold medal and set a world record for the 4×200 m freestyle relay, a silver medal for the 4×100 m freestyle relay, and another silver medal for the 4×100 m medley relay. In the 1996 games, he represented newly-formed Russia, and won a silver medal for the 4×100 m freestyle relay.

Masters swimming
After a successful professional swimming career, Vlad Pyshnenko continues to swim through the U.S. Masters Swimming program. Currently, Pyshnenko holds 3 World records and a couple of American records in masters program: For men 35-39 he holds the 100 yards freestyle American record of 44.24 seconds short course yards (SCY), and the 200 meters freestyle World Record of 1:52.84 long course meters (LCM). For men 40-44 he holds the 100 meters freestyle World record of 51.72 seconds (LCM), and the 200 meter freestyle World record of 1:53.65 (LCM).

Coaching
Since arriving in the U.S., Pyshnenko has coached at COHO Swim Club, Glenbrook Aquatics (formerly Northbrook Spartan Swim Club) in Northbrook, Illinois, Deerfield High School in Deerfield, Illinois, and at CATS Aquatic Team. He is currently the Head Senior Coach for the CATS Aquatic Team in Libertyville, Illinois.

Personal life
Pyshnenko has one daughter, Daria Pyshnenko (b. 1999). Pyshnenko resides in Mundelein, Illinois.

References

External links
 
 
 
 USMS

1970 births
Living people
Russian male swimmers
Olympic swimmers of the Unified Team
Olympic swimmers of Russia
Swimmers at the 1992 Summer Olympics
Swimmers at the 1996 Summer Olympics
Olympic gold medalists for the Unified Team
Olympic silver medalists for the Unified Team
Olympic silver medalists for Russia
Soviet male swimmers
Sportspeople from Rostov-on-Don
Russian swimming coaches
World record setters in swimming
Russian male freestyle swimmers
World Aquatics Championships medalists in swimming
European Aquatics Championships medalists in swimming
Medalists at the 1996 Summer Olympics
Medalists at the 1992 Summer Olympics
Olympic gold medalists in swimming
Olympic silver medalists in swimming